Moncontour is a commune in the Vienne department in the Nouvelle-Aquitaine region in western France.

It was the site of the Battle of Moncontour in 1569.

Notable people 

The composer Raymond Vaillant was born here on 21 January 1935.

Politician Maria Rabaté was born in Moncontour, on 3 July 1900.

Demographics

Sites and monuments

See also
Communes of the Vienne department

References

External links

 Mayor's Office
  Communauté de Communes du Pays Loudunais - CCPL
  Aerial view of Moncontour.
  EXO Active Park
  http://www.moncontour-active-park.fr

Communes of Vienne